Rookery Bay Reserve protects 110,000 acres of coastal lands and waters at the northern end of the Ten Thousand Islands on the gulf coast of Florida, Rookery Bay National Estuarine Research Reserve represents one of the few remaining undisturbed mangrove estuaries in North America.

The Rookery Bay and Ten Thousand Islands ecosystem is a prime example of a nearly pristine subtropical mangrove forested estuary. Rookery Bay Reserve is located in the West Florida subregion of the West Indian Biogeographic Region.

History
A 10-mile loop road through Rookery Bay was proposed in 1963. The road would have facilitated vast coastal development around Rookery Bay, but a new perspective emerged in the community With the help of the Collier County Conservancy, the Nature Conservancy, the Collier Audubon Society, and a number of private investors, a grass roots effort resulted in the purchase of 3,362 acres. This acreage eventually became the Rookery Bay National Estuarine Sanctuary, with official designation by the National Oceanic and Atmospheric Administration in 1980. Shortly thereafter, the name was changed to Rookery Bay National Estuarine Research Reserve.

Environmental Learning Center

The Environmental Learning Center is a 16,500 square-foot building with four research laboratories, two classrooms and an auditorium, and a two-story visitor center. The Visitor Center has a variety of hands-on experiences, including a large 2,300-gallon aquarium and interactive displays addressing research and stewardship efforts within the Reserve. A nature store, art gallery and picnic area are other amenities within the Environmental Learning Center.

Coastal Training Program

The Coastal Training Program educates working professionals to find environmental-friendly solutions for environmental issues. Fertilizer runoff is a recurring event in Southwest Florida and this program's objective is to deter any activity that will harm the local environment. Training, field education, and networking are benefits that the working professionals will receive through Coastal Training in partnership between Florida Department of Environmental Protection, Collier County, University of Florida/IFAS Collier County Extension Office, Rookery Bay National Estuarine Research Reserve and the City of Naples.

Friends of Rookery Bay
The Friends of Rookery Bay (FORB) is a non-profit organization that supports Rookery Bay National Estuarine Research Reserve's fundraising goals. FORB addresses the challenges that the Reserve faces for its coastal land and water management. Volunteer events, outreach efforts, and fund-raising programs are a few of the many ways that FORB helps Rookery Bay.

FORB also assists the Environmental Learning Center by maintaining store inventory, tour-guiding boat and kayak trips, and informing the community of ethical stewardship.

Activities

Volunteers
Hundreds of Rookery Bay volunteers play an important role in the preservation, restoration and management of our estuaries in the donation of over 18,000 hours each year. Many of Rookery Bay's research and resource management projects are completed by the assistance of many dedicated volunteers.

Student events
Rookery Bay teaches approximately 3,000 students each year. Many students are educated through field trips where they have the opportunity to have hands-on experience. One of the programs-Estuary Explorers- is organized for fourth-grade students in Collier County. This educational program involves classroom research, hands-on activities, and teacher training workshops. Another program, Rookery Bay SURVIVORS, is organized for seventh-grade students. Rookery Bay SURVIVORS engages students and teachers with the region's coastal and estuarine environment. The activities in this program allows students to utilize critical thinking skills, in-depth questioning, and scientific processes.

Stewardship
Reserve resource managers facilitate land acquisition, conduct habitat and hydrology restoration projects, eradicate and control invasive plants and animals, protect listed species, respond to marine mammal strandings, manage important habitats and conduct prescribed fires to sustain native biodiversity.

Team OCEAN
Team OCEAN is a volunteer program- partnered between Rookery Bay National Estuarine Research Reserve, Florida Sea Grant, and other community contributors- that follows the model set at the Florida Keys National Marine Sanctuary. The Team OCEAN volunteers frequently visit areas in the Reserve where people make a recurring visit. Team OCEAN ensures that boaters are practicing ethical procedures and are aware of "Leave-No-Trace" guidelines. Additionally, the volunteers also clean the waste that are left by negligent boaters which influence other boaters to pick up after themselves. The efforts from Team OCEAN help Rookery Bay uphold its pristine environment.

Tours
Rookery Bay National Estuarine Research Reserve offers guided boat and kayak tours. The small boat tours- with a maximum capacity of six passengers per boat- offer a firsthand and personal experience. These tours are led by the Rookery Bay Reserve staff and each have a different theme. The boat tours are offered seasonally: November through April.

The kayak tours offer a more independent experience; visitors can paddle as fast or slow as they would like while being led by the tour guide. These tours are offered from November through May.

Research
Researchers from wide arrays of wildlife specializations study at Rookery Bay. The work from the researchers allows the Reserve to overlook its resources with the information gathered from the scientists. Current researchers are conducting research on the invasive Burmese pythons, native box turtles, invasive downy rose myrtle and the history of devastating hurricanes in Southwest Florida. 
Rookery Bay has various facilities –laboratories (dry and wet) and dorms- to aid the researchers that travel from around the world.

See also
National Estuarine Research Reserve
Conservancy of Southwest Florida

References

External links
Rookery Bay National Estuarine Research Reserve - official site

National Estuarine Research Reserves of the United States
Wetlands of Florida
Bays of Florida on the Gulf of Mexico
Estuaries of Florida
Museums in Collier County, Florida
Natural history museums in Florida
Buildings and structures in Naples, Florida
Protected areas of Florida
Protected areas of Collier County, Florida
Education in Collier County, Florida
National Estuarine Research Reserves of Florida
Nature centers in Florida
Landforms of Collier County, Florida
1980 establishments in Florida
Protected areas established in 1980